The Adventure Air Adventurer is a family of American homebuilt amphibious flying boats that was designed and produced by Adventure Air of Berryville, Arkansas. When it was available the aircraft was supplied as a kit for amateur construction. The company appears to be out of business.

Design and development
The aircraft features a strut-braced high-wing, a four-seat enclosed cockpit, retractable tricycle landing gear, a boat hull with outrigger pontoons, a cruciform tail and a pod-mounted single engine in pusher configuration.

The airframe is made from composites. The recommended engines vary by model.

The factory estimated the construction time from the supplied standard kit as 1000 hours, or 400–600 hours from the quick-build kit.

Operational history
By 1998 the company reported that 120 kits had been sold and five aircraft were flying.

By November 2013 ten examples had been registered in the United States with the Federal Aviation Administration.

Variants
Adventurer 2+2
Model with 2+2 seating and a  sleeping bunk. The standard engine recommended is the  Lycoming IO-360 powerplant.

Adventurer 333
Heavier model with higher engine power. The standard engine recommended is the  Chevrolet HO350 automotive conversion powerplant.

Adventurer Heavy Hauler
The long range and heavy lift version of the design, that was also envisioned for military sales. The standard engine recommended is the  Chevrolet HO350 automotive conversion powerplant.

Specifications (Adventurer 333)

References

External links
Photo of an Adventurer 333

Adventurer
1990s United States sport aircraft
Single-engined pusher aircraft
High-wing aircraft
Homebuilt aircraft
Amphibious aircraft
Flying boats